The Fourteenth Legislative Assembly of Haryana constituted after the 2019 Haryana Legislative Assembly elections. Legislative Assembly election was held in Haryana on 21 October 2019 to elect 90 members of the Haryana Legislative Assembly. The results were announced on 24 October 2019.

Members of Legislative Assembly

References 

 
 
Haryana